Delfino (It: "Dolphin") can refer to:

 Delfino (name), which can be both a surname and a given name
 Italian submarine Delfino (1890)
 Italian submarine Delfino (1930)
 Delfino Pescara 1936, an Italian football team
 Delfino (car company), manufacturer of the Delfino Feroce
 Alfa Romeo Delfino, or simply Delfino, a 1983 concept car
 Isle Delfino, a fictional island in Super Mario Sunshine